Luis Carlos Prieto Zayas (born 20 April 1988) is a Paraguayan footballer. His last club was 22 de Septiembre.

External links
 
 

1988 births
Living people
Paraguayan footballers
Paraguayan expatriate footballers
Sportivo Trinidense footballers
Club Olimpia footballers
Magallanes footballers
Primera B de Chile players
Expatriate footballers in Chile
Association football defenders